The following is a list of brick and mortar institutions that primarily offer postgraduate degrees with distinction in research publication and research.

By category

By country 
Austria
Austrian Institute of Technology
Belgium
College of Europe

France
INSEAD
IFP School

Germany
Berlin Mathematical School

India
Indian Institute of Social Welfare and Business Management
Institute of Development Studies, Kolkata
Government Institute of Science, Aurangabad
M S Ramaiah School of Advanced Studies
Madras School of Economics
University of Hyderabad

Iran
Graduate University of Advanced Technology
Institute for Advanced Studies in Basic Sciences
Institute for Cognitive Science Studies
Institute for Research in Fundamental Sciences
Tarbiat Modares University

Israel
Weizmann Institute of Science

Japan
International University of Japan
Japan Advanced Institute of Science and Technology
Nara Institute of Science and Technology
Okinawa Institute of Science and Technology
The Graduate University for Advanced Studies

Poland
College of Europe

Singapore
INSEAD

South Korea
 KDI School of Public Policy and Management
 Reformed Theological Seminary
 Transnational Law and Business University

Spain
ICFO

Sri Lanka
Postgraduate Institute of Management 
Postgraduate Institute of Medicine

Switzerland
European Graduate School
Graduate Institute of International and Development Studies
Robert Kennedy College

Thailand
Asian Institute of Technology
Chulabhorn Graduate Institute
CMKL University
National Institute of Development Administration
Vidyasirimedhi Institute of Science and Technology

United Kingdom
 Cranfield University
 London Business School
 London School of Hygiene & Tropical Medicine
 Royal College of Art
 The Institute of Cancer Research
 School of Advanced Study

United States
 A.T. Still University
 Adler University
 Air Force Institute of Technology
 Albert Einstein College of Medicine
 Fielding Graduate University
 Claremont Graduate University
 Claremont Lincoln University
 David E. Skaggs Research Center
 Erikson Institute
 Frederick S. Pardee RAND Graduate School 
 Institute for Advanced Study
 The Institute of World Politics
 Joint Special Operations University
 Mayo Clinic College of Medicine and Science
 Maryland University of Integrative Health
 National Defense University
 Naval Postgraduate School
 Naval War College
 Oregon Health & Science University
 Professional School of Psychology
 Rockefeller University
 Salk Institute for Biological Studies
 Scripps Research
 Toyota Technological Institute at Chicago
 U.S. Army War College
 University of California, Hastings College of the Law
 University of California, San Francisco

References

Postgraduate-only
Universities and colleges by type